The Best American Short Stories 2001, a volume in The Best American Short Stories series, was edited by Katrina Kenison and by guest editor Barbara Kingsolver.

Short stories included

Notes

2001 anthologies
Fiction anthologies
Short Stories 2001
Houghton Mifflin books